People's Republic of China–Ethiopia relations were established in 1970. Ethiopia has an embassy in Beijing and the People's Republic of China has an embassy in Addis Ababa. By 2016-2018, Chinese direct investment (FDI) in Ethiopia had reached US$4 billion and bilateral trade had grown to $5.4 billion.

History 
It is not precisely known when China and Ethiopia first made direct contact. The sinologist A. Hermann believed that a live rhinoceros that arrived at the court of the Chinese Emperor Ping from the country of the "Agazi" or "Agazin" between AD 1 and 6 came from the Horn of Africa; however other sinologists locate that country far closer to China, perhaps in Malaysia, India or Indonesia. Ethiopian expert Richard Pankhurst is certain that by the Tang dynasty (618–907) "the Chinese were acquainted with at least part of the Horn of Africa and were trading indirectly if not directly with the Somali coast." From that period onwards, China traded with not only Ethiopia and the Horn, but with the peoples of the Eastern African coast, obtaining elephants' tusks, rhinoceros horns, pearls, the musk of the civet cat, ambergis, and slaves. Starting in the Yuan dynasty the Chinese began to increasingly trade directly with Africans, which is attested not only in contemporary documents, but from archeological finds of Chinese coins and porcelain.

Despite this early commercial contact, neither side showed much interest in diplomatic activity with one another until the twentieth century. China was one of only five governments which refused to recognize Italy's conquest of Ethiopia. Relations were poor during the Haile Selassie era, when Ethiopia was allied with the western powers in the Cold War. Chinese support for the Eritrean People's Liberation Front contributed to tension between the countries from 1967. However, the two countries established diplomatic relations on 1 December 1970 when China agreed to recognize Eritrea as Ethiopian, in exchange for Haile Selassie's recognition of Taiwan as Chinese. In 1971 Ethiopia supported China's bid for a permanent seat in the United Nations and it voted in favour to admit Beijing and replace Taipei. Relations improved for a short period after the Ethiopian revolution of 1974, but became strained as the Ethiopian military junta developed increasingly close ties with the Soviet Union. After the Ethiopian People's Revolutionary Democratic Front took power in 1991, relations have steadily improved, with increasing diplomatic contacts and growing trade and Chinese investment in the Ethiopian economy.

Official contacts and treaties

Chinese premier Zhou Enlai visited Ethiopia in January 1964. The Ethiopian emperor Haile Selassie visited Beijing in October 1971, where he was received by Mao Zedong. Qian Qichen, China's vice-premier and minister of foreign affairs, visited Ethiopia in July 1989, January 1991 and January 1994. Chinese president Jiang Zemin visited in May 1996.

In June 2001 the Ethiopian deputy foreign minister visited Beijing, where he expressed support for the "One China" policy in the dispute with Taiwan. In December 2003, Chinese premier Wen Jiabao visited Ethiopia to attend the opening of the China-Africa Cooperation Forum. In December 2004, the heads of the Ethiopian and Chinese legislatures met in Beijing and in a joint statement said that the two counties wish to expand all aspects of cooperation. In May 2007, China's Assistant Minister of Commerce Wang Chao visited Addis Ababa and signed a debt relief agreement worth US$18.5 million. In February 2008, the Chinese minister of construction met his counterpart in Addis Ababa, and reemphasized the commitment of the two governments to cooperation. The Ethiopian minister welcomed the involvement of Chinese construction companies in improving Ethiopian infrastructure. In November 2008 the chairman of the standing committee of China's National People's Congress visited Ethiopia where he met senior Ethiopian officials and political leaders including President Girma Wolde-Giorgis and discussed ways to strengthen economic cooperation.

Agreements between the two countries include Agreement for Economic and Technological Cooperation (1971, 1988 and 2002); Trade Agreement (1971, 1976); Trade Protocol (1984,1986,1988); Agreement for Trade, Economic and Technological Cooperation (1996) and  Agreement for Mutual Promotion and Protection of Investment (1988). In May 2009 the two countries signed an agreement to eliminate double taxation, expected to boost trade and investment.

Economic relations 

The economic relationship is multi-faceted. Between 2000 and 2014, China provided over $12 billion in loan finance (usually tied to infrastructure projects undertaken by Chinese firms). There is growing Chinese investment in the Ethiopian economy, while imports of cheap consumer goods from China ($3.4 billion in 2015) greatly exceeding exports from Ethiopia to China ($380 million in 2015). The Chinese appear to be interested in Ethiopia for political reasons (among African countries, its governance and developmental orientation is closest to that of China, and it hosts the African Union headquarters), and as a business partner. Ethiopia's focus on infrastructure has created numerous opportunities for Chinese construction firms. Ethiopia is also a significant market for Chinese exports that will expand as Ethiopia's rapid economic growth continues. For Ethiopia, Chinese finance provides critical support for the government's legitimacy, as electricity, transport, and employment opportunities continue to expand, stimulating economic growth and helping promote exports to other countries. China's "business is business" approach is welcome by comparison to western aid providers who often link their contributions to changes in the Ethiopian legal and political structure.

Direct aid

Chinese aid to Ethiopia has included dispatch of medical teams and teachers, and educational scholarships for Ethiopian students studying in China. Former Ethiopian President Mulatu Teshome was educated in China. China's aid program funded the construction of a vocational school in Ethiopia. Although the plan was to use Chinese vocational instructions, the school eventually switched to German instructors, with students learning skills including engineering, automobile, architecture and construction. In June 2009, the Chinese ambassador assisted in laying the foundation stone for the Tirunesh Dibaba Beijing Hospital, planned as a modern hospital 6000 square meters in size with 100 beds. The Chinese government is funding construction and will provide medical instruments and equipment. The hospital is named after Ethiopian runner Tirunesh Dibaba, who won two gold medals at the 2008 Beijing Olympics. The hospital was completed in November 2011 and handed over to the Ethiopian government. Fifteen Chinese medical personnel were sent to help their Ethiopian counterparts.

Infrastructure Loans

Chinese government has also provided large loans to Ethiopia, of which some are concessional (i.e. with a grant element above 25 percent). These are nearly all tied to construction projects to be undertaken by Chinese enterprises such as the Addis Ababa ring road opened in 2003.

Some Chinese-built projects are financed by the Ethiopian government. In 2002, for example, the Sino Hydro Corporation started work on the estimated US$224 million Tekeze hydroelectric project with a 607-foot dam on the Tekezé River due for completion in 2007. After delays due in part to problems with massive landslides, the project was completed for a final cost of US$365 million in July 2009 and should deliver 300 megawatts of power. In July 2009, Ethiopia signed further agreements with China for the Sino Hydro Corporation to build 2,150 megawatts of hydro-electric capacity with the Gibe IV (Omo River) and Halele Werabesa dams, in a deal worth US$2.67 billion. China will cover 85% of the project costs through preferential buyer's credit and concessionary loans. The environmentalist Richard Leakey has expressed concerns about the possible impact of the Omo river dams on Lake Turkana.
The Export-Import Bank of China funded a railway from Addis Ababa to landlocked Ethiopia's main port in neighboring Djibouti, completed in 2016.

Investment and trade

By 2009, direct Chinese investment in Ethiopia had reached US$900 million.

Exports from Ethiopia to China have grown from negligible levels before 2000 to around US$130 million in 2006, primarily in raw materials such as sesame seeds and partially finished leather.  Meanwhile, exports from China to Ethiopia have grown from under US$50 million in 1996 to US$430 million in 2006, including low-priced clothing, machinery and electronics equipment. The Ethiopian government has encouraged imports, purchasing Chinese equipment and supplying it to local construction and manufacturing firms on a lease-to-buy basis. Trade continues to grow rapidly. By 2015 bilateral trade had grown to $3.8 billion, with Ethiopian exports encouraged through special quota and tariff arrangements on many goods. In a paper prepared for the OECD, economist Tegegne Gebre Egziabher of Addis Ababa University notes that in the short term, cheap Chinese imports may have damaged local producers. However, the longer term benefit may be to stimulate improvements in efficiency and quality. Chinese investment in local infrastructure may assist towards this outcome.

The Abole incident

In April 2007 fighters from the Ogaden National Liberation Front, a group of ethnic Somalis seeking independence from Ethiopia attacked workers at an exploratory oilfield in Abole, a small town about 120 km south of Jijiga in eastern Ethiopia. They killed about 65 Ethiopian and nine Chinese workers, and kidnapped another seven Chinese. The oilfield is run by a subsidiary of the government-owned China Petroleum and Chemical Corporation (Sinopec). A Sinopec spokesperson said that the incident would not discourage the firm from further exploration. The Chinese Foreign Ministry avoided discussing the attackers' motives beyond stating that they were  attempting to sabotage China's relationship with Ethiopia. A Chinese team was dispatched to investigate what had happened and look into ways of improving safety in the future.

See also 

 Foreign relations of the People's Republic of China
 Foreign relations of Ethiopia
 Sino-African relations
 Chinese people in Ethiopia
 AU Conference Center and Office Complex
 Addis Ababa–Djibouti Railway
 Addis Ababa Light Rail
 Addis Ababa–Adama Expressway

References

External links
 

 
Ethiopia
Bilateral relations of Ethiopia
Ethiopia